Paul Heussenstamm is a painter and lecturer from the United States.  He began painting full-time at the age of 26.  He conducts "Art as a Spiritual Path" workshops.  Heussenstamm's work has been featured in Unity in Chicago, Illinois; Agape in Santa Monica; and Church of Religious Science, Santa Barbara; His art is also featured at Deepak Chopra’s in La Jolla, California; Esalen, in Big Sur, California; and Oglethorpe University Museum in Atlanta, Georgia.  Both spiritual and multicultural, he is considered the premier artist representing the mandala painting.

Bio
Paul Heussenstamm is the son of the artist and writer, Karl Heussenstamm, and artist and psychologist, Frances Heussenstamm.  The household consistently engaged in spiritual discussion with notable guests such as Sufi Master Pir Inayat Khan, actor Gig Young, transcendental painter Emil Bisttram, and health guru Gypsy Boots.

Heussenstamm's brothers, Mark and John Heussenstamm all lead lives as artists.

Though originally aspiring to be a plein air painter, Heussenstamm's spiritual and artistic journey led him from landscape paintings, to flower paintings, and on to discovering his passion for mandala paintings.  His first mandala was painted at a spiritual workshop conducted by Brugh Joy with notable participants such as Barbra Streisand and Carrie Fisher.  He was introduced to the healing potential of mandalas through the work and mentorship of Beverly Sheiffer.  With permission, he adopted her method of painting mandalas for spiritual revitalization.  Heussenstamm has continued to receive patronage for his mandala paintings throughout his journey.

Books
Heussenstamm authored the book, Divine Forces: Art that Awakens the Soul.  He also coauthored several books: 
Color Yourself Calm: A Mindfulness Coloring Book; The Art of Mandala Meditation: Mandala Designs to Heal Your Mind; and Body and Spirit Mandala Masterworks: Beauty. Stillness. Presence.

References

1951 births
Living people
Artists from Los Angeles
21st-century American painters
21st-century American male artists
20th-century American painters
American male painters
20th-century American male artists